Emaar Pakistan is a subsidiary of the Dubai-based real estate development company Emaar Properties. The company develops residential and commercial projects in different parts of Pakistan, including Crescent Bay, Karachi and Canyon Views, Islamabad.

Emaar Panorama Karachi Location

Emaar Crescent Bay, DHA Phase VIII, Karachi – Pakistan

History

In May 2004, Defence Housing Authority, Karachi and Emaar Pakistan signed a memorandum of understanding to construct Crescent Bay, Karachi. In 2007, Emaar began construction of Crescent Bay.

In 2006, Emaar Pakistan announced to develop over 100 acres mixed-use Canyon Views in Islamabad at cost around US$2.4 billion.

In November 2008, Dr Dia Malaeb was appointed as new CEO of Emaar Pakistan.

Emaar Panorama is a planned waterfront residence launched in March 2020. It will be located in DHA Phase 8.

References

Real estate companies of Pakistan
Pakistani subsidiaries of foreign companies